Madabout was a children's programme broadcast in the '80s on Children's ITV, made by Tyne Tees Television and hosted by Matthew Kelly in 1983 and 1984, and Michael Bentine in 1981–82.

Northeast DJ Tony Douglas <sammy> appeared on Madabout in 1981.

Transmission guide
 Series 1: 13 editions from 2 December 1981 – 24 February 1982
 Series 2: 13 editions from 6 January 1983 – 31 March 1983
 Series 3: 13 editions from 16 February 1984 – 10 May 1984

References

1980s British children's television series
1981 British television series debuts
1984 British television series endings
ITV children's television shows
Television series by ITV Studios
Television shows produced by Tyne Tees Television